Design of a Decade: 1986–1996 is the first greatest hits album by American singer Janet Jackson, released on October 10, 1995 by A&M Records. It features 14 of Jackson's top 40 hits from her three previous albums; Control (1986), Janet Jackson's Rhythm Nation 1814 (1989), janet. (1993), and two new tracks; "Runaway" and "Twenty Foreplay".

It was well received by many critics, who cited the number of hit singles on the record, but many noted its misleading title as the album's content predominantly spanned a five-year period. It was certified Double Platinum by the RIAA, within 4 months of release sold more than 4.3 million copies.

Background
Jackson fulfilled her contract with A&M Records, signing a multimillion-dollar contract with Virgin Records estimated between $32 million and $50 million, making her the highest paid recording artist at the time. Jackson's fifth studio album Janet, stylized as janet. and read "Janet, period", was released in May 1993. The record opened at number one on the Billboard 200, making Jackson the first female artist in the Nielsen SoundScan era to do so. Certified sixfold platinum by the RIAA, it sold over 14 million copies worldwide. Janet spawned six singles and four promotional singles, receiving various certifications worldwide. Lead single "That's the Way Love Goes" won the Grammy Award for Best R&B Song and topped the Billboard Hot 100 for eight consecutive weeks. "Again" reached number one for three weeks, while "If" and "Any Time, Any Place" peaked in the top four. "Because of Love" and "You Want This" charted within the top ten.

As Jackson's contract with Virgin allotted her the option to leave the label during this time, she returned to A&M in order to release Design of a Decade: 1986–1996, her first compilation album. A&M provided an aggressive marketing plan for the compilation's release, which included "a multimillon-dollar worldwide marketing plan that [involved], syndicated and local TV advertising, as well as print ads in a number of consumer publications, including Seventeen, Us, Rolling Stone, Vanity Fair, Jet, Vibe and Essence." Billboard magazine reported that DreamWorks SKG and A&M were interested in signing with her. A&M president Al Cafaro stated: "We've always thought Janet was an A&M artist... And we would love to sign her if she is available. This project has reminded us how much fun she is to work with." Jackson renewed her contract with Virgin Records for a reported $80 million the following year. The contract established her as the then-highest paid recording artist in history, surpassing the recording industry's then-unparalleled $60 million contracts earned by Michael Jackson and Madonna.

Reception

Critical

Most music reviewers had a positive reception to Design of a Decade, mainly because of the amount of chart-topping singles it contained, but many noted the "misleading title" as the content predominantly spanned a five-year period.

Stephen Thomas Erlewine of AllMusic gave it a four and-a-half out of five star rating, saying "Design of a Decade: 1986-1996 is a misleading title. The bulk of Janet Jackson's greatest-hits collection concentrates on Control and Rhythm Nation 1814, simply by contractual necessity. The hits from those two albums were state-of-the-art dance-pop productions at the time of their release, filled with bottomless beats and memorable, catchy hooks. It's a credit to Janet that the two new numbers ["Runaway" and "Twenty Foreplay"] feel like genuine hits, not tacked-on filler, and help make the album a compulsively listenable greatest-hits collection." With a B+ rating, David Browne of Entertainment Weekly stated, "Working with producers and collaborators Jimmy Jam and Terry Lewis, Jackson reinvented both pop and herself during those 10 years. With its rigid Robo-drummer beats and homogenized blend of computers and vocal harmonies, the music was shocking in its airtight quality [...] Design is fairly seamless, yet its biggest flaw lies in its title. Due to contractual obligations, the album consists almost entirely of songs from Control and Rhythm Nation 1814 and includes only one ("That's the Way Love Goes") of the five top 10 hits from her 1993 smorgasbord janet. The new songs ["Runaway" and "Twenty Foreplay"] show how much more confident a singer Jackson has become, even if the latter number finds her still working overtime to show us she's an honest-to-God grown-up."

Robert Christgau of The Village Voice gave it an A− rating, saying "Those who begrudge her the place she's earned in the pop cosmos have some catching up to do." With a rating of 7/10 (flawed yet worthy), Spin magazine's Chris Norris said: "Since Janet is State-of-the-art production right down to her sculpted nose, it makes sense that she should call her retrospective Design. As the studio team that wrought Control, Rhythm Nation and janet. (which for record-label reasons is under-represented here), designers Jimmy Jam and Terry Lewis are unofficial second and third Janet Jacksons. Their triumph is letting their dazzling sound sculptures fade into the background of Janet's cartoon antics." Elysa Gardner with  Vibe magazine was in high praise of Design of a Decade, as well as Jackson herself, stating, "It's been almost 10 years since Janet Jackson announced that her first name wasn't Baby, and it's easy to forget what a bold proclamation that was coming from a woman—particularly a black woman—at that time [...] Only two women were there to remind the rest of us that there was power and freedom in feminine sexuality—to reinforce the fact that we could be adorable and flirtatious and strong and assertive. And Madonna wasn't a sista. [...] The 16 songs on her greatest hits package 1986/1996: Design of a Decade—which includes two strong new singles—trace a young woman's progression from questioning others' authority to reveling in her own."

Commercial
The album debuted at number 4 on the U.S. Billboard 200 for the week of October 28, 1995 with 129,000 copies sold, and eventually peaked at number 3. Two months after its release, it was certified Double Platinum by the RIAA. In Canada, the album peaked at number 5 and received a Platinum certification,. In the UK, the album peaked at number 2 and went on to receive a double platinum by the British Phonographic Industry, and remains Jackson’s best selling album in the country. In Europe, the album peaked within the top 5 in most markets and received a Platinum certification by the International Federation of the Phonographic Industry. In Australia, the album peaked at number 2 and was certified quadruple Platinum by the Australian Recording Industry Association, Making it Her best selling album in that country. The album also appeared on the Australian ARIA albums year end charts at number 6.

Track listing

Personnel

 Melanie Andrews – arranger
 Jerome Benton – vocals
 Lee Blaske – arranger
 Patrick Demarchelier – photography
 Alan Friedman – programming
 Larimie Garcia – design
 Greg Gorman – photography
 Jeri Heiden – art direction, design
 Steve Hodge – engineer, mixing
 Goh Hotoda – remixing
 Janet Jackson – arranger, executive producer, main performer, producer, rhythm, vocals, background vocals
 Jimmy Jam – arranger, assistant engineer, multiple instruments, producer, rhythm, vocals
 Jellybean Johnson – producer, remix consultant, vocals

 Terry Lewis – multiple instruments, producer
 Bob Ludwig – mastering
 John McClain – executive producer
 Monte Moir – arranger, assistant engineer, producer
 Shep Pettibone – post-production, remixing
 Herb Ritts – photography
 David Ritz – liner notes
 Mike Scott – guitar
 Tony Viramontes – photography
 Michael Wagener – remixing
 Bruce Weber – photography
 Steve Wiese – assistant engineer, engineer, producer
 Eddie Wolfl – photography

Charts

Weekly charts

Year-end charts

Certifications and sales

Release history

References

External links
Design of a Decade 1986/1996 Video Page at janetjackson.com

1995 greatest hits albums
Janet Jackson compilation albums
Albums produced by Jimmy Jam and Terry Lewis
A&M Records compilation albums
Universal Records compilation albums